The Old Great Falls Historic District is an area of Paterson, New Jersey between South Paterson and Hillcrest, Paterson. The area is a thin strip of neighborhoods and parklands around the Passaic River and Garret Mountain. This section of Paterson has two National Natural Landmarks, Garret Mountain and Great Falls on the Passaic. It is the location of the highest point in Paterson. It is home to Lambert Castle and Alexander Hamilton's Society for the Establishment of Useful Manufactures (S.U.M.), which used the force of Great Falls to power the mills along the Passaic in the Dublin section. The neighborhood is also home to part of Garret Mountain Reservation and Overlook Park around the Grand Street Reservoir. The neighborhood is bounded by the border with Hillcrest by the Passaic River, by the Woodland Park (formerly West Paterson) border, the South Paterson border along Valley Road and Route 19. It is separated from Downtown Paterson to the north by Route 19, Oliver Street and Spruce Street.

The Great Falls Historic District is mostly above I-80 and along the Passaic River. The city has attempted to revitalize the area in recent years, including the installation of period lamp posts and the conversion of old industrial buildings into apartments and retail. Many artists live in this section of Paterson. A major redevelopment project is planned for this district in the coming years. The Paterson Museum and Lambert Castle are situated in this neighborhood.

The northern section is the Great Falls Historic District.
The southern section, roughly below Rockland Street and New Street, is Stoney Road.

References
Great Falls Historic District Special Resource Study
Great Falls State Park

External links

Restoration Photos from Cooke Administration Building, 2005 - Landmark Studios

Neighborhoods in Paterson, New Jersey